The Summerside City Council is the governing body for the city of Summerside, Prince Edward Island, Canada. The council consists of the mayor and eight councillors by ward.

Current Summerside City Council 
Mayor, Basil Stewart
St. Eleanors - Bayview Ward 1 Councillor, Bruce MacDougall
St. Eleanors - Slemon Park Ward 2 Councillor, Justin Doiron
Summerside - North Ward 3 Councillor, Barb Ramsay
Clifton - Market Ward 4 Councillor, Cory Snow
Hillcrest - Platte River Ward 5 Councillor, Greg Campbell
Centre East - Downtown Ward 6 Councillor & Deputy Mayor, Norma McColeman
Greenshore - Three Oaks Ward 7 Councillor, Brian McFeely
Wilmot Ward 8 Councillor, Carrie Adams

References

External links 

Municipal councils in Prince Edward Island
Politics of Summerside, Prince Edward Island